Acacia orthotricha is a shrub belonging to the genus Acacia and the subgenus Lycopodiifoliae. It is native to an area in the Northern Territory and the Kimberley region of Western Australia.

The greyish shrub typically grows to a height of  produces yellow flowers in June.

See also
 List of Acacia species

References

orthotricha
Acacias of Western Australia
Taxa named by Leslie Pedley